Victor Loche (1806–1863) was a French soldier and naturalist.

In 1856–1857, he participated in an expedition to the Algerian part of the Sahara, and described the mammals and birds of Algeria in the book Catalogue des mammifères et des oiseaux published in 1858.
He first described the sand cat Felis margarita from a specimen found in the area of Négonça in the Sahara, and proposed to name the cat in recognition of Jean Auguste Margueritte who headed the expedition.

Published works 
 Description d'une nouvelle espèce de Zorille, 1856.
 Catalogue des mammifères et des oiseaux, Paris : Bertrand, 1858; later published in English by: Book On Demand Ltd, 2014.
 Histoire naturelle des mammifères, Paris, Arthus Bertrand, 1867; part of series: Exploration scientifique de l'Algérie pendant les années 1840, 1841, 1842/

References

French zoologists
1806 births
1863 deaths
French male writers